The 1969 Green Bay Packers season was their 51st season overall and their 49th season in the National Football League. The  team finished with an 8–6 record under coach Phil Bengtson, earning them a 3rd-place finish in the Central division.

The Glory Was Gone 
Without the disciplined guidance of Vince Lombardi steering the Packers for the first time in a decade, Green Bay started the season strong at 5–2 but stumbled down the stretch. Plagued by injuries and inconsistent play, the team clawed their way to their 10th winning season in the last 11 years.

Regardless of the winning record, by season's end several future Hall of Famers departed or retired (among those who retired or departed that year were the likes of Willie Davis and Herb Adderley), leaving the team scrambling to rebuild its depleted roster. As eager as Packer fans were to recapture the winning ways of Lombardi, it was obvious Titletown would have to wait to regain its luster.

Offseason

NFL draft
The NFL draft was held on Tuesday, January 28, 1969. The Packers had the 12th pick overall and selected Rich Moore, a Defensive Tackle from Villanova. At this stage of the draft, several high profile players, such as running backs Calvin Hill and Ron Johnson, quarterback Terry Hanratty, and defensive lineman Dave Foley, Ted Hendricks and Fred Dryer were still available. The selection of Moore was made by Phil Bengtson. The Packers Personnel Director Pat Peppler and Lombardi both disagreed with the selection. After the draft, Lombardi announced that he was leaving the club to coach the Washington Redskins.

Roster

Preseason
On August 30, a crowd of 85,532 fans viewed a doubleheader at Cleveland’s Municipal Stadium. In the first contest, the Chicago Bears played the AFL’s Buffalo Bills, while the Cleveland Browns hosted the Green Bay Packers in the second match.

Regular season

Schedule

Season summary

Week 1

Source: Pro-Football-Reference.com

Week 2

Standings

References

Sportsencyclopedia.com

Green Bay Packers seasons
Green Bay Packers
Green